Sidoarjo Station (SDA) is a railway station located in Lemahputro, Sidoarjo, Sidoarjo Regency, East Java, Indonesia. The station passes the railway to the east (Jember-Banyuwangi) and the path to Malang-Blitar. The station located at the height of + 4 meters is included in the Operation Area VIII Surabaya.

History 
The station initially had seven track with track 1 as a straight track, but track 5 has now been evicted for new platforms and tracks 6 and 7 have now been evicted in 1992 for the purpose of shop development. Formerly this station contained locomotive depot and warehouse, but was demolished in 1992 due to the construction of shop.

As a first-class train station, almost all trains stop at this station. Only freight trains (tank and cement) are passing directly / do not stop.

Services 
Passenger trains that use this station are :

Mixed class 

Economy class 
 Jayabaya to  via  and 
 Sri Tanjung to  via  and Ketapang
 Probowangi to Ketapang and

Commuter and Local train 
 Penataran to  via  and 
 Lokal Bojonegoro to  via 
 Jenggala to  via

References

External links 

Sidoarjo Regency
Railway stations in East Java